Jūkichi, Jukichi or Juukichi is a masculine Japanese given name. Notable people with the name include:

, Japanese farmer and soldier 
, Japanese castaway
, Japanese actor
, Japanese poet

Japanese masculine given names